The 2011 season was São Paulo's 82nd season since the club's existence. After finishing the national league in ninth position in previous year, the team was not able to take part on Copa Libertadores for the first time in seven years. In Campeonato Paulista was eliminated by rival Santos in a single semifinal match, being defeated in Morumbi stadium by 0–2. Tricolor played also the Copa do Brasil but was eliminated in quarterfinals losing to Avaí in aggregate score, 1-0 (home); 1-3 (away). In Copa Sudamericana was defeated by Paraguayan club Libertad at the round of 16. The club finished the season with a sixth position in the league, not qualifying to Copa Libertadores. The highlight of year was the goalkeeper and capitain Rogério Ceni. The oldest and considered main player of club reach the accomplishment of 100 goals in career (since 1997) on 27 March against rival Corinthians by Campeonato Paulista with a 2–1 win and a done of 1000 matches on 7 September also victory by 2–1 against Atlético Mineiro in the Série A.

Players

Current squad
As of 10 Septemter 2011

Out on loan

Transfers

In

Out

Statistics

Appearances and goals

 
 
 
 

 

 
 

 

 
 
 
 
 

 

 
 
 
 
 

 
 
 
 
 
 
 
 
 
 
 

 
 
 

|}

1Wellington became nº 5 after the transfer of Miranda to Atlético de Madrid. Before he wore nº 28
2Juan became nº 6 after the transfer of Júnior César to Flamengo. Before he wore nº 16
3Casemiro became nº 8 after the loan of Cléber Santana to Atlético Paranaense. Before he wore nº 29
4Rodrigo Caio became nº 18 after the transfer of Rodrigo Souto to Júbilo Iwata. Before he wore nº 36

Scorers

Managers performance

Competitions

Overall

{|class="wikitable"
|-
|Games played || 70 (21 Campeonato Paulista, 7 Copa do Brasil, 38 Campeonato Brasileiro, 4 Copa Sudamericana)
|-
|Games won || 37 (14 Campeonato Paulista, 5 Copa do Brasil, 16 Campeonato Brasileiro, 2 Copa Sudamericana)
|-
|Games drawn || 13 (2 Campeonato Paulista, 0 Copa do Brasil, 11 Campeonato Brasileiro, 0 Copa Sudamericana)
|-
|Games lost || 20 (5 Campeonato Paulista, 2 Copa do Brasil, 11 Campeonato Brasileiro, 2 Copa Sudamericana)
|-
|Goals scored || 112
|-
|Goals conceded || 75
|-
|Goal difference || +37
|-
|Best result || 4–0 (H) v Bragantino - Campeonato Paulista - 2011.2.194–0 (H) v Ceará - Campeonato Brasileiro - 2011.9.17
|-
|Worst result || 0–5 (A) v Corinthians - Campeonato Brasileiro - 2011.6.26
|-
|Most appearances || Rogério Ceni (68)
|-
|Top scorer || Dagoberto (22)
|-

Campeonato Paulista

Record

Copa do Brasil

Record

Campeonato Brasileiro

Record

Copa Sudamericana

Record

References

External links
official website 

São Paulo FC seasons
Sao Paulo F.C.